Tijany Atallah (born 12 March 2003) is a professional footballer who plays as a defender for  club Bordeaux. Born in France, he is a youth international for Algeria.

Early life 
Tijany Atallah grew up in Vernet, Haute-Garonne, where he started playing football at the age of three. He joined Colomiers in 2013 before also joining the federal  of Castelmaurou two years later.

Club career 
After a one-year spell with Balma during the 2017–18 season, Atallah joined the Bordeaux academy in 2018 as an under-16. He made his professional debut for the club's senior team on 2 January 2022, starting as a center-back in a Coupe de France round of 32 game, a 3–0 away loss to Brest.

International career 
Atallah is a youth international for France, having played a friendly game against Italy in 2019 with the under-17. In 2021, he was selected with Algeria under-20s for the UNAF Tournament, where despite his side disappointing overall performance, he was among the Algerian revelations.

Style of play 
A versatile defender, Atallah is able to play as a center-back or on both flanks of the defense, and even as a defensive midfielder.

References

External links

 

2003 births
Living people
People from Muret
Algerian footballers
Algeria youth international footballers
French footballers
France youth international footballers
French sportspeople of Algerian descent
Association football defenders
US Colomiers Football players
Balma SC players
FC Girondins de Bordeaux players
Championnat National 3 players
Footballers from Occitania (administrative region)
Sportspeople from Haute-Garonne